Conus martinianus is a species of sea snail, a marine gastropod mollusk in the family Conidae, the cone snails, cone shells or cones.

These snails are predatory and venomous. They are capable of "stinging" humans.

Description
The size of the shell attains 50 mm. The spire can have a regular conical shape or convex and contains 12 whorls with rather deep, punctulated striae. The smooth body whorl is obtuse at its summit and shows a small number of grooves at its base. The aperture is narrow and becomes almost imperceptibly wider at its anterior extremity, ending in a rather deep indentation. its color is uniform dark brown to lighter brown, interrupted in older specimens by narrow, longitudinal white bands.

Distribution
This marine species occurs off the Philippines and off the Solomon Islands.

References

 Tucker J.K. & Tenorio M.J. (2013) Illustrated catalog of the living cone shells. 517 pp. Wellington, Florida: MdM Publishing.
 Puillandre N., Duda T.F., Meyer C., Olivera B.M. & Bouchet P. (2015). One, four or 100 genera? A new classification of the cone snails. Journal of Molluscan Studies. 81: 1-23

External links
 To World Register of Marine Species
 Cone Shells - Knights of the Sea
 

martinianus
Gastropods described in 1844